Chwalisław may refer to the following places in Poland:
Chwalisław in Gmina Złoty Stok, Ząbkowice Śląskie County in Lower Silesian Voivodeship (SW Poland)
Other places called Chwalisław (listed in Polish Wikipedia)